Iridana marina is a butterfly in the family Lycaenidae. It is found in Uganda, the north-eastern part of the Democratic Republic of the Congo and north-western Tanzania. The habitat consists of forests.

The larvae probably feed on lichens among ants. During the day, it hides in a crack in the bark with a light silken covering over it.

References

Butterflies described in 1935
Poritiinae